Navai (also Romanized as Navā’ī) is a village in Valdian Rural District, Ivughli District, Khoy County, West Azerbaijan Province, Iran. At the 2006 census, its population was 343, in 89 families.

References 

Populated places in Khoy County